Eric Conradi (25 July 1920 – 22 August 1972) was an English cricketer. He played seven first-class matches for Cambridge University Cricket Club in 1946.

See also
 List of Cambridge University Cricket Club players

References

External links
 

1920 births
1972 deaths
English cricketers
Cambridge University cricketers
Sportspeople from Kensington